Trichoglossus is a genus of lorikeet in the Psittaculidae or true parrot superfamily. The genus is distributed widely through Australia, Wallacea and Melanesia, with outliers in the Philippines and Micronesia.  Members of the genus are characterised by barring, sometimes prominently, on the upper breast.

Taxonomy
The genus Trichoglossus was introduced in 1826 by the English naturalist James Francis Stephens. The name combines the Ancient Greek thrix meaning "hair" and glōssa meaning "tongue". The type species was subsequently designated as the coconut lorikeet.

Following the publication of a molecular phylogenetic study of the lorikeets in 2020, three species were moved from Trichoglossus  to the newly erected genus Saudareos. These were the Mindanao lorikeet, the ornate lorikeet and the Sula lorikeet (formerly the citrine lorikeet).

Species
The genus contains ten species:

References

 
Psittacidae
Taxonomy articles created by Polbot